Events from the year 1957 in Iran.

Incumbents
 Shah: Mohammad Reza Pahlavi 
 Prime Minister: Hossein Ala' (until April 3), Manouchehr Eghbal (starting April 3)

Events
 2 July – The Sangchal earthquake with a magnitude of 7.1 strikes Mazandaran province, killing at least 1,100 people.

Births

 26 March – Shirin Neshat.
 16 June – Hamid Aboutalebi.

See also
 Years in Iraq
 Years in Afghanistan

References

 
Iran
Years of the 20th century in Iran
1950s in Iran
Iran